Fred Andrews may refer to:

Fred Andrews (rugby union) (1864–1929), Welsh rugby union player
Fred Henry Andrews (1866–1957), British artist and scholar
Fred Andrews (baseball) (born 1952), American baseball player
Frederick Cyrus Andrews (1902–1988), British writer on and for radio
Frederick Andrews (cricketer) (1905–1983), on List of Wellington representative cricketers
Fred Andrews (Archie Comics), a fictional character in Archie Comics

See also
Frederick Andrew